South Park High School is a high school located in Buffalo, New York. It serves Grades 9 - 12 and teaches according to the Board of Regents. The current principal is Mr. Michael Morris, and the current assistant principals are Mrs. Molly Forero, Mr. Joshua Miller, Mrs. Kathleen Thomas, and Dr. Carlos Wallace.

History 
South Park is located in South Buffalo. It was organized and built in 1914. For its first year, the school was temporarily housed at School 36. It was designed by architect Edward Brodhead Green.

From 2007 to 2009, South Park High School was renovated and the school was temporarily housed at School 187, which formerly housed Buffalo Academy for Visual and Performing Arts. South Park High School's building reopened in 2009.

Annexes 
Beginning in the 1930s, South Park High began opening up annexes in other school buildings due to the excessive student body account. The first annex was opened in 1932 at School 67, with a second being opened a few years later at School 72, and a third at School 69 in 1936. The following year, the School 72 and 69 annexes were closed and replaced by the School 7 annex. In 1941, both the School 7 and School 67 annexes were closed and all students attended the main building. School 67 would later be revived as an annex in the late 60's and continued to operate as such until the early 1990s.

Alumni 
Rose Bampton–Opera singer (Class of 1925)
Brian Higgins–Congressman of New York State's 27th District (Class of 1978)
C. Wade McClusky - Rear Admiral USN, pilot at the Battle of Midway (Class of 1918)
Warren Spahn–Former Milwaukee Braves pitcher
Joseph Conley–Actor
Theresa Drilling-Schuta–Former Principal of South Park High School (Class of 1978)
Anthony "A.J." Verel–Former World Champion kickboxer, martial artist; actor; stuntman (Class of 1988)
Amanda Blake- Actor- Kitty from hit show Gunsmoke

References

External links
 School Website

High schools in Buffalo, New York
Public high schools in New York (state)
Green & Wicks buildings